Kedzie is an 'L' station on the CTA's Brown Line. It is an at-grade station located in Chicago's Albany Park neighborhood at 4648 North Kedzie, with an auxiliary entrance at 4649 North Spaulding Avenue.

The station and nearby Kedzie Avenue are both named after John H. Kedzie, an early Chicago real-estate developer.

History

Kedzie Station was originally constructed in 1907 as part of Northwestern Elevated Railroad's Ravenswood line. The station house was replaced in 1975, and the whole station was demolished and rebuilt in 2006 as part of the Brown Line Capacity Expansion Project. The new station, which opened on August 16, 2006, can support eight railcars, and is ADA compliant.

On October 1, 2009, the parking lot for this station was closed.

1977 fatal accident
This station was the site of a fatal 1977 accident involving an intoxicated Korean immigrant who was electrocuted by the third rail while attempting to urinate on the track.  The CTA was found 50% responsible and the $1.5 million judgment against them was eventually affirmed by the Illinois Supreme Court in 1992.  The majority opinion, signed by Justice Charles E. Freeman, noted that there was evidence before the trial court that this particular stretch of railroad line is one of the only railroad lines in the United States that uses an unprotected, unguarded, and unfenced third rail.

References

External links 

 Kedzie (Ravenswood Line) Station Page at Chicago-'L'.org
 Train schedule (PDF) at CTA official site
 Spaulding Avenue entrance from Google Maps Street View
 Kedzie Avenue entrance from Google Maps Street View

Albany Park, Chicago
CTA Brown Line stations
Railway stations in the United States opened in 1907
1907 establishments in Illinois